Picanya is a municipality in the comarca of Horta Sud in the Valencian Community, Spain.

Summary of council election results 
The Spanish Socialist Workers' Party has had an absolute majority of seats since the restoration of democracy in the late 1970s.

Source:

References 

Municipalities in the Province of Valencia
Horta Sud